Pietro Paolo Tamburini (1594 - 1621) was an Italian painter of the Baroque period.

He was a pupil of Federico Barocci. He was active in Perugia and Gubbio. In the latter, his native town, he painted a Visitation (1620) for the Sant'Ubaldo and for the church of Santa Maria della Piaggiola.

References

1594 births
1621 deaths
17th-century Italian painters
Italian male painters
Italian Baroque painters
Umbrian painters